Emma Junaro (born 1 November 1953 in Oruro, Bolivia) is a Bolivian musician.  

Junaro's style incorporates Brazilian popular music, European folk styles and Andean music.  She has worked with the record producer Fernando Cabrero on recording the poems of Matilde Casazola, a poet.  Junaro's instrumentation is always acoustic, and has included zampona, charango, quena, piano and guitar.

Discography
Albums
Resolana (1981)
Mi Corazón en la ciudad (1987)
Entre dos silencios (1997)
Tu semilla (1998) (with Jaime and César Junaro)

Contributing artist
The Rough Guide to the Music of the Andes (1996, World Music Network)
Unwired: Latin America (2001, World Music Network)

References
 

1953 births
Living people
People from Oruro, Bolivia
Bolivian musicians